Miss Canada is a beauty pageant for young women in Canada. It was founded in Hamilton in 1946. No title was awarded from 1993 through 2008. The trademark was purchased in 2009 by a Québec organization who produces the pageant under the name to this day.
According to the new Miss Canada and Miss Teen Canada web site, the title was re-established with a focus on personality over physical appearance. 
The Miss Canada competition is Canada's oldest extant beauty pageant.

Winnifred Blair of Saint John, New Brunswick was proclaimed the first "Miss Canada" on 11 February 1923 at an earlier, unrelated competition during the Montreal Winter Carnival. The runner-up in that event was Muriel Harper of Winnipeg, Manitoba.

The first broadcast of the Miss Canada pageant aired on November 10, 1963 on CTV with news anchors Peter Jennings and Baden Langton hosting. Gordon MacRae was hired to sing the first Miss Canada Pageant song. Each of the 23 contestants was escorted by a young officer of the Canadian Armed Forces. Carol Ann Balmer of Toronto won, and Lise Mercier of Quebec City was Miss Congeniality. The escorts were selected and supervised by a young Armoured Corps Officer, J. R. Digger MacDougall, who escorted the runner up, Lise Mercier. 

Jennings remained as solo host until 1966 and was replaced by game show host Jim Perry, who hosted the pageant until 1990. Dominique Dufour, the winner of the Miss Canada Pageant in 1981, co-hosted with Perry from 1982 until 1990. The final pageant before its initial cancellation aired in late 1991 and was hosted by Peter Feniak and Liz Grogan.

The show was popular in the 1970s, with up to 5 million viewers, but declined in the 1980s, until it was cancelled in 1992. Producers of the show cited mounting production costs, as the reason for cancellation. The last winner was Miss Canada 1992 Nicole Dunsdon from British Columbia.

Between 1947 and 1962, the Miss Canada Pageant sent delegates to the Miss America pageant. No Miss Canada ever won Miss America but some placed. 

The Miss Canada Pageant obtained the franchise for the Miss Universe Pageant in 1978, when that year's first runner-up, Andrea Leslie Eng, competed internationally. From 1979 to the final 1992 contest before cancellation, the winners of Miss Canada went on to compete. Miss Canada 1982, Karen Baldwin, is the only Miss Canada to also win Miss Universe. Since 2003, Canada's representative to Miss Universe has been chosen by the Miss Universe Canada pageant.

Winners

The following is a list of winners:

 Connie-Gail Feller won the Miss Canada 1962 title and competed at Miss America, however was dethroned on 20 September 1961.

Miss Canada at International Pageants

Miss Canada at Miss Universe

Miss Canada at Miss America

Hosts 
Jaclyn Miles, a former Miss Canada: 2016-2019

Jim Perry: 1967-1991

Peter Jennings: 1963-1966

See also
Miss Earth Canada
Miss Universe Canada
Miss World Canada
Miss Dominion of Canada
Miss Canada International
Miss Universe
Miss America

References

External links
 British Pathe newsreel of Miss Canada 1948
 https://web.archive.org/web/20150924102501/http://www.pageantopolis.com/international/canada_1970s.htm
 https://web.archive.org/web/20110831093051/http://www.pageantopolis.com/international/canada_1980s.htm

 
Canada
Canada
Beauty pageants in Canada
1945 establishments in Ontario
Canadian awards
Recurring events established in 1945